Aaha! Gold Cup (Nepali: आहा ! गोल्ड कप āhā gōlḍ kap) is an annual international football tournament held in Pokhara, Nepal, and organized by the Sahara Club. It was formerly known as the Caravan Gold Cup, however due to sponsorship reasons it is currently known as the Aaha! Rara Gold Cup. It is considered a major football tournament in Nepal, and is therefore endorsed by ANFA Kaski, a district FA of the All Nepal Football Association.

Background
Sahara Club (Pokhara) have been running a football-based academy for under-privileged children from the profit of the tournament and donations from various individuals and organisations. At present, there are 30 children at the academy

The major attraction of the cup is the involvement of major clubs of Nepal and some international clubs. The cup is recognized by ANFA and is included in its annual calendar. The tournament is conducted in knockout format and 12 teams compete for the title. The tournament is the main event keeping the spirit of football alive in Nepal and handsomely rewards the clubs and players. It is also the longest sporting event to be held regularly. For the first time in history in 2019 there were only 10 club competing due to tight schedule of tournament all over Nepal and Date issue.

On the 13th edition of the tournament, English non-league side Aldershot Town FC entered in the tournament, and thus became the first European (UEFA) club to compete in the tournament's history.

Due to the COVID-19 Pandemic, 19th edition of the tournament only featured 8 teams. Due to the reoccurrence of COVID-19, the 20th edition was held as a closed-door tournament for the 1st time in the history of the tournament but from the semi-final, 1/3 of the spectators were allowed in stadium by following all covid safety protocols

Previous winners

Top performing clubs

External links
Aaha Rara Gold Cup Official Anthem
BBC South report 
RSSSF.com - Nepal - List of Champions and Cup Winners
Sahara Club official website

References

 
Football cup competitions in Nepal
Sport in Pokhara